Claude Nicouleau (born 22 December 1961) is a French speed skater. He competed at the 1988 Winter Olympics and the 1992 Winter Olympics.

References

External links
 

1961 births
Living people
French male speed skaters
French male short track speed skaters
Olympic speed skaters of France
Olympic short track speed skaters of France
Speed skaters at the 1988 Winter Olympics
Short track speed skaters at the 1992 Winter Olympics
Sportspeople from Neuilly-sur-Seine
20th-century French people